Francisco Madinga (born 11 February 2000) is a Malawian footballer who plays as a midfielder for Georgian club Dila Gori. He was included in Malawi's squad for the 2021 Africa Cup of Nations.

International career
He made his debut for Malawi national football team on 24 March 2021 in an AFCON 2021 qualifier against South Sudan.

References

External links
 

2000 births
Living people
Malawian footballers
Malawi international footballers
Association football midfielders
Mighty Wanderers FC players
FC Dila Gori players
Erovnuli Liga players
Malawian expatriate footballers
Expatriate footballers in Georgia (country)
2021 Africa Cup of Nations players